Horb station is a railway station in the municipality of Horb am Neckar, located in the Freudenstadt district in Baden-Württemberg, Germany.

References

Railway stations in Baden-Württemberg
Buildings and structures in Freudenstadt (district)
Railway stations in Germany opened in 1866